Pencil Packin' Papa is an album by jazz pianist Horace Silver released on the Columbia label in 1994 featuring performances by Silver with Oscar Brashear, Ron Stout, Jeff Bernell, George Bohanon, Maurice Spears, Suzette Moriarty, Red Holloway, James Moody, Eddie Harris, Rickey Woodard, Bob Maize, and Carl Burnett, with vocals by O.C. Smith.

The Allmusic review by Scott Yanow awarded the album 4 stars and states: "This CD's main assets are the many new compositions by Horace Silver and his colorful arrangements for the six-piece brass section... In addition, O.C. Smith does a fine job on his four vocals although Silver's abilities as a lyricist are still open to question. However his piano solos are typically exciting and inventive and Silver has obviously lost none of his enthusiasm even after four decades of music making."

Track listing
All compositions and lyrics by Horace Silver
 "Pencil Packin' Papa" - 5:48
 "I Got the Dancin' Blues" - 7:08
 "Soul Mates" - 6:50
 "I Need My Baby" - 7:02
 "My Mother's Waltz" - 6:11
 "Red Beans and Rice" - 7:21
 "Blues for Brother Blue" - 8:13
 "Let It All Hang Out" - 4:56
 "Señor Blues" - 6:58
 "Viva Amour" - 5:59
Ocean Way Recording Studios, Los Angeles, CA - January 10 & 11, 1994

Personnel
Horace Silver - piano
Oscar Brashear, Ron Stout, Jeff Bernell - trumpet, flugelhorn
George Bohanon - trombone
Maurice Spears - bass trombone
Suzette Moriarty - french horn
Red Holloway, James Moody, Eddie Harris, Rickey Woodard - tenor saxophone
Bob Maize - bass
Carl Burnett - drums
O.C. Smith - vocals

References

Horace Silver albums
1994 albums
Columbia Records albums